Chemba District is a district of Sofala Province in Mozambique. The principal town is 
Chemba. The district is located in the north of the province, and borders with Tete Province in the northeast, Caia District in the southeast, Maringué District in the southwest, and with Tambara District of Manica Province in the northwest. It has a population of 65,107 as of 2007.

Geography
The district is located at the right bank of the Zambezi.

The climate of the district is tropical semi-arid at the bank of the Zambezi and tropical dry in the interior.

History
The name Chemba as the designation of the area appeared in the colonial times, its origin is unclear.

Demographics
As of 2005, 48% of the population of the district was younger than 15 years. 13% of the population spoke Portuguese. The most common mothertongue among the population was Cindau. 88% were analphabetic, mostly women.

Administrative divisions
The district is divided into three postos, Chemba (two localities), Chiramba (two localities), and Mulima (two localities).

Economy
Less than 1% of the households in the district have access to electricity.

Agriculture
In the district, there are 10,000 farms which have on average  of land. The main agricultural products are corn, cassava, cowpea, peanut, pearl millet, sorghum, and sweet potato.

Transportation

There is semi-public transportation between Chemba and Beira.

References

Districts in Sofala Province